Eli Cook (1814–1865) was Mayor of the City of Buffalo, New York, serving in 1853 and from 1854 to 1855. He was born in Palatine Bridge, New York on January 23, 1814. He took up law in 1830, passed the bar exam, and in 1837 he practiced in Tennessee and Mississippi with rebel General Simon B. Buckner. In 1838, he moved to Buffalo where he became one of the leading criminal lawyers. He married around 1838, but his wife died soon after; he re-married in 1843, to Sarah L. He was appointed city attorney in 1845, and again in 1851.

He was elected mayor on March 1, 1853, as the Democratic candidate. During his term, the city charter was revised to make the mayor's term two years and the Common Council would elect its own presiding officer; the mayor would no longer be president. Additionally, many of the city offices that were filled by Council appointment were now to be elective.  The charter also annexed Black Rock into the city of Buffalo.  He was reelected for a second term on November 8, 1853, as the first two-year Buffalo mayor, and the first mayor to serve consecutive terms.

After serving as mayor he returned to his law practice. He died on February 25, 1865, and was buried in Forest Lawn Cemetery.

References

1814 births
1865 deaths
Mayors of Buffalo, New York
Burials at Forest Lawn Cemetery (Buffalo)
People from Palatine Bridge, New York
New York (state) Democrats
19th-century American politicians